Kazancı is a belde (town) in Ermenek district of Karaman Province, Turkey. According to town page the name of the town may refer to Kazancıklı region in Balkan Province of Turkmenistan from where the original residents of the town migrated. The population of the town is 2615  as of 2010.

Future

According to Sustainable development report prepared by the Ministry of Environment and Forestry (Turkey) the projected population of Kazancı in 2025 is 13200. The present master plan  of the town is found to be sufficient for the future expansion.

References

Populated places in Karaman Province
Towns in Turkey
Ermenek District